Major-General Walter Edmond Clutterbuck  (17 November 1894 – 2 February 1987) was a British Army officer who fought during both the First and Second World Wars.

Early life and military career
Born in Chippenham, Wiltshire, England, on 17 November 1894, the son of Hardenhuish squire Edmund Henry Clutterbuck and Madeline Charlotte Raikes, Walter Edmond Clutterbuck was educated at Cheltenham College and later entered the Royal Military College, Sandhurst, where, on 17 September 1913, he was commissioned into the Royal Scots Fusiliers of the British Army.

Shortly after the First World War began in August 1914, he was dispatched along with his battalion to England, where it became part of the 21st Brigade of the 7th Division, soon after the outbreak of war. The battalion arrived on the Western Front in October where it fought in the First Battle of Ypres and sustained very heavy casualties. Clutterbuck was promoted to the temporary rank of lieutenant on 31 October 1914 (made permanent in January 1915), and promoted to captain 20 March 1916. From 15 October 1915 he served as adjutant of the 1/10th Battalion, London Regiment, part of the 162nd (East Midland) Brigade of the 54th (East Anglian) Division, in Gallipoli, Egypt and Palestine, later becoming adjutant of the Suffolk Yeomanry, and finally becoming a brigade major with the 232nd Brigade. He ended the war having been awarded the Military Cross (with Bar), the Order of the Crown of Italy, was twice wounded in action and was mentioned in dispatches. His MC citation reads:

His older brother, David Clutterbuck, a lieutenant in the Royal Field Artillery, was not so fortunate, having been killed in action in May 1917.

In October 1919, after serving in Russia during the Russian Civil War, he married Gwendolin Atterbury Younger; they had one son and two daughters; Rosemary Imogen Atterbury, Michael Edmund Henry, born on 22 July 1920, and Ann Hope Madaline, born on 24 September 1922.

Between the wars
He spent most of the interwar period as a captain, being promoted to major on 8 November 1933, later serving as a brigade major with the 156th (Scottish Rifles) Brigade from 1 April 1935 until 11 March 1937. On 30 August 1939, he was promoted to lieutenant colonel and became Commanding Officer (CO) of the 1st Battalion, Royal Scots Fusiliers, then in Poona, India.

Second World War
With his battalion, he returned to the United Kingdom in July 1940, ten months after the outbreak of the Second World War, which soon became part of Brigadier Sir Oliver Leese's 29th Independent Infantry Brigade Group. In October he was promoted to the acting rank of brigadier and succeeded Brigadier Evelyn Barker in command of the 10th Infantry Brigade, part of the 4th Infantry Division, stationed in the United Kingdom in Southern England awaiting a German invasion. On 18 November 1941 he was promoted to the general officer rank of acting major-general and became General Officer Commanding (GOC) of the 1st Infantry Division in succession to Major General Edwin Morris. The division was a Regular Army formation, with a few Territorial Army (TA) units, which, like the 4th Division, had fought in France in 1940 and had recently moved to East Anglia, serving under Lieutenant-General Kenneth Anderson's II Corps. On 3 February 1942 Clutterbuck's permanent rank was made colonel (with seniority backdated to 1 January). In June 1942 the division was converted into a 'mixed' division of two infantry brigades and one tank brigade, before reverting to a standard infantry division in November. On 18 November, a year after he was made an acting major-general, Clutterbuck's rank of major-general was made temporary, with his permanent rank still being colonel.

In late February 1943 the division left the United Kingdom, destined for French North Africa, where, from late April, it was involved in heavy fighting in the final stages of the Tunisian campaign, mainly under the command of Lieutenant General Charles Allfrey's V Corps, part of Lieutenant General Kenneth Anderson's British First Army until the campaign ended on 13 May. Despite suffering heavy casualties the division earned three Victoria Crosses and captured thousands of Axis soldiers. In mid-June, the division took part in Operation Corkscrew, the Allied invasion of the Italian island of Pantelleria and, despite Clutterbuck's fears that his division would suffer heavy losses, casualties were minimal, with only one man being killed and the Italian garrison of 14,000 surrendered. The division returned to North Africa soon after. However, on 31 July he handed over command of the division, which he had now commanded for over twenty months, to Major General Gerald Templer, who had briefly been his corps commander in England, and returned to the United Kingdom. For his services in North Africa he was awarded the Distinguished Service Order (DSO) on 5 August.

On 15 August he became GOC of the 55th (West Lancashire) Infantry Division, a first line TA formation. The division was badly understrength, having been reduced to the Lower Establishment in January 1942, and was not fit for active service, although in May 1944 it was raised to the Higher Establishment, and returned to England around the same time. Clutterbuck remained with the division until handing over to Major General Horatio Berney-Ficklin on 13 July 1944.

Post-war
After the war Clutterbuck retired from the army on 18 October 1946, with the honorary rank of major-general. He eventually settled in North Yorkshire, where he farmed, and remained there until his death on 2 February 1987 at the age of 92. He was a local councillor and was Chairman of the Bedale Hunt for many years.

He is buried in St Mary Churchyard in North Yorkshire.

References

Bibliography

External links
Generals of World War II

|-

1894 births
1987 deaths
Burials in North Yorkshire
British Army generals of World War II
British Army personnel of the Russian Civil War
British Army personnel of World War I
Companions of the Distinguished Service Order
Graduates of the Royal Military College, Sandhurst
People educated at Cheltenham College
People from Chippenham
Recipients of the Military Cross
Recipients of the Order of the Crown (Italy)
Royal Scots Fusiliers officers
Suffolk Yeomanry officers
British Army major generals
Military personnel from Wiltshire